Jega is a Local Government Area in Kebbi State, Nigeria. Its headquarters are in the town of Jega.

It has an area of 891 km and a population of 193,352 at the 2006 census.

3 2 Target population Jega LGA has an estimated population of 193,352 people as at 2006 National population Census.

Projected using 3.1% as an annual increase:

3 mm x 193,352 =253,291 (projected population of 2016)

From the 2006 NPC, JegaLGA has the population sizeof 193,3 52 persons. Hence;

’3.1/100 = 0.031 X 193,352 =5,994 x 10 years = 59939 + 193,352 = 253, 291 (projected population of Jega LGA in 2016).

Jega has produced many prominent people in Nigeria,  One of such is Professor Attahiru Jega,  former INEC Chairman

The postal code of the area is 863.

References

Local Government Areas in Kebbi State